Anatole Novak (12 February 1937 – 5 January 2022) was a French professional road bicycle racer.

Career
Novak won a stage in the 1961 Tour de France, and was the Lanterne rouge (last finishing cyclist) in the 1964 Tour de France.

Personal life and death
Novak died in Pierre-Châtel on 5 January 2022, at the age of 84.

Major results

1956
 National Road Championship (Independents)
1959
Saint-Brieuc
1961
GP Vincennes
Riom
Tour de France:
Winner stage 4
Grand Prix du Parisien
1962
Gap
1964
Ambert
1965
Tour de l'Herault
1966
Saint-Vallier
Paris–Luxembourg
1967
Boucles des Hauts de Seine
1969
Toury
Sévignac
1970
Vuelta a España:
Winner stage 10

References

External links

 
 Official Tour de France results for Anatole Novak

1937 births
2022 deaths
People from La Mure
French male cyclists
French Vuelta a España stage winners
French Tour de France stage winners
Sportspeople from Isère
Cyclists from Auvergne-Rhône-Alpes